Nadia Nakai Dlamini (née Kandava; born 18 May 1990), is a Zimbabwean-South African rapper and television personality.

Early life and education 
Nakai was born in South Africa. Her father is South African and her mother is Zimbabwean. When she was 16 years old, her surname was changed from her father's to her mother's.

Nakai attended Fourways High School in Johannesburg for a year then finished her schooling in Kenya. She later studied a degree in marketing, communication, and media studies at Monash University, Johannesburg.

Career

2013–2017: Beginnings 
Nakai made her first television appearance on the e.tv hip hop show Shiz Niz where she won the Mixtape 101 competition, making her the first female to win the competition. She then rose to prominence in September 2013, when she released her debut single "Like Me". The following year, she was featured on the remix of Riky Rick song, Amantombazane amongst various South African  acts. As for June 2015, Nakai released her third single "Saka Wena" featuring rapper Ice Prince, following her second single, "Whatever" featuring DotCom and Psyfo.

In August 2016, Nakai pre-released her single "The Man" featuring Cassper Nyovest from her EP, Bragga. Bragga was then released on 15 September 2016. In November 2017, Nakai released her critically acclaimed single "Naaa Meaan" featuring Cassper Nyovest. The song topped charts in several radio stations in South Africa. On 4 November 2016, she hosted the red carpet special for MTV Africa at the 2018 MTV Europe Music Awards.

2017–2020: Nadia Naked, and Def Jam Africa 
In 2019, Nakai co-hosted the MTV Base hip hop show, Yo! MTV Raps South Africa alongside television presenter Siyabonga Ngwekazi. On 3 May 2019, Nakai confirmed that her debut album Nadia Naked would be released on 28 June 2019. On 18 May 2019, "Imma Boss" was released as the third single accompanied by the album's artwork cover. On 15 October 2020, she released a documentary on Showmax about the making of the album Nadia Naked. In May 2020, she signed a record deal with Def Jam Africa.

At the 6th ceremony of AFRIMA, she took-home Best Female Artist award. She was awarded the most stylish performing artist at the 2020 SA Style Awards.

2021–present: TV shows 
In 2021, Nakai hosted the first season of Channel O's Gen-Z South Africa television show. In June 2021, she left Family Tree Records to pursue her own label. At the 2021 South African Hip Hop Awards, Nakai received a nomination for Artist of the Decade.

In 2022, Nakai appeared on the Netflix original reality show Young, Famous & African.

Influences 
Nakai was inspired by a female Kenyan rapper, Nazizi, who she met while she was staying in Kenya. She said that Nazizi influenced her in starting her rapping career.

Awards and nominations

Discography

Studio album

Extended Play

Singles

As lead artist

As featured artist

References

Notes

External links 

Living people
1990 births
South African women rappers
South African songwriters
South African hip hop musicians
Monash University alumni
South African people of Zimbabwean descent